George Synadenos Astras was a Byzantine official and provincial governor.

In 1354, holding the title of megas stratopedarches, he was entrusted with the renovation of the Hagia Sophia. In 1355 he was named governor of Ainos in Thrace, remaining in the post until . In 1360–1364 he was governor of the island of Lemnos, and then of Thessalonica, until his death from the plague sometime before August 1368.

He had estates on Lemnos, some of which were inherited by his son, Michael Synadenos Astras (died 1400), and others which were granted to the Athonite monasteries of Great Lavra, Vatopedi, and Dionysiou. He was related by marriage to Emperor John V Palaiologos, and a friend and correspondent of the scholar Demetrios Kydones.

References

Sources

 
 

1366 deaths
14th-century Byzantine people
14th-century deaths from plague (disease)
Byzantine governors
Byzantine governors of Thessalonica
Medieval Lemnos
Byzantine architects
Synadenos family